Morgans Hotel Group (NASDAQ: $MHG) was a global, publicly-traded hotel company founded by Ian Schrager, inventors of the boutique hotel category with the 1984 opening of Morgans Hotel in New York City. MHG was listed on the NASDAQ exchange for over a decade.

History

1984-2006: Ian Schrager's Morgans Hotel: World's first boutique hotel
In 1984, Studio 54 cofounder, Ian Schrager and his business partner Rubell opened their first hotel, Morgans Hotel, named after John Pierpont (JP) Morgan's Morgan Library & Museum next-door. Designed by Andrée Putman, the instant hit introduced the boutique hotel category, becoming a "worldwide phenomenon." It has triple-arched entrances that remain today.

Royalton Hotel & Paramount Hotel: Lobby socializing
Following the success of Morgans Hotel, they opened the well-received Royalton Hotel and Paramount Hotel, both designed by Philippe Starck. With these properties, Schrager introduced "lobby socializing" where the hotel lobby became a new kind of gathering place for hotel guests and New York City residents alike, and "cheap chic" was affordable luxury offered in a stylish, sophisticated environment.

Delano Hotel & Mondrian Hotel: Urban resort
Schrager is also credited with inventing the "urban resort" with his Delano Hotel in Miami and Mondrian Hotel in West Hollywood, also designed by Starck.

Hudson Hotel et. al: Hotel as lifestyle
These were followed by the Hudson Hotel in New York, where he fully realized his concept "hotel as lifestyle" which he continued to refine, expanding to cities such as San Francisco with the Clift Hotel and London with St. Martins Lane Hotel and the Sanderson Hotel, all designed by the prolific Starck.

NASDAQ: $MHG IPO
In June 2005, Schrager sold most of his stake in Morgans Hotel Group to launch the Ian Schrager Company. Despite stepping down as Chair and CEO, he retained $4 million in consultant pay and perks through end of 2007.

On Valentine's Day 2006, $MHG IPO'ed in a $360 million-target raise underwritten by Morgan Stanley, with Schrager cashing in his remaining 450,000 shares for another $9 million. Lance Armstrong served as a Board Member at IPO, and Morgans Hotel Group was a publicly traded company on NASDAQ for over a decade.

2013: Ron Burkle vs. Alfred Taubman/Sothebys heir proxy war
In 2013, there was the end of lawsuit regarding a proxy war for Morgans control between two billionaire interests:

Yucaipa, the investment alter ego of Ron Burkle, who loaned MHG $75 million in 2009 (during the recession),
 vs. the Morgans Chairman and Interim Acting CEO, representing 13% majority interest of an investment vehicle for his grandfather, Alfred Taubman, owner of Sotheby's and Short Hills Mall, among other real estate interests.

It had no permanent CEO to lead the company since 2013.

2016-2017: Sam Nazarian's SBE Entertainment Group M&A
After years-long battle and board-rejected offers to buy MHG, Burkle partnered with Sam Nazarian's SBE Entertainment Group, who agreed to acquire MHG for $805 million, in a take-private transaction completed November 30, 2016.

Burkle converted his Morgans existing equity stake into a SBE ownership stake with a board seat. SBE also received investment from Cain international, a global real estate investment company headed by Todd Boehly and Jonathan Goldstein. Nazarian retained majority ownership of SBE, remaining its Founder & CEO leading day-to-day operations. The son of Qualcomm board member and stakeholder Younes Nazarian (via M&A), Nazarian and SBE are better known as owners of LA lounges frequented by celebrity patronage and HBO's Entourage, appearing as himself in the "No Cannes Do" episode.

The merged company owned or operated over 20 hotels, including six properties under SBE's flagship SLS brand.

2017-2018 closure: No. 237 (PE luxury condo conversion)
In July 2017, the building was purchased as private equity by Shel Capital and Kash Group, who closed Morgans Hotel and converted it to luxury condos in 2018, named No. 237.

Portfolio
As an independent company before M&A, MHG owned and managed 17 hotels in Doha, Istanbul, London, ] Los Angeles, Las Vegas, Miami Beach, New York and San Francisco comprising over 3,000 rooms. Each of its hotels was designed by a world−renowned designer:

New York
Morgans Hotel (1984) - designed by Andrée Putman
Royalton Hotel - designed by Philippe Starck
Hudson Hotel

South Beach
Delano Hotel
Mondrian Hotel - designed by  Marcel Wanders
Shore Club Hotel

Los Angeles
Mondrian Hotel - designed by Benjamin Noriega-Ortiz

Las Vegas
Delano Las Vegas- opened in 2014 as a rebranding of THEhotel at Mandalay Bay, in partnership with MGM Resorts International.

San Francisco
Clift - designed by Philippe Starck

London
St Martins Lane Hotel - designed by Philippe Starck
Sanderson Hotel - designed by Philippe Starck
Mondrian London at Sea Containers (2014)- designed by Tom Dixon

Doha
Mondrian Doha

Istanbul
10 Karakoy A Morgans Original (2014) - located in historical, Eski Balıklı Han. The architectural work of the historical Büyük Balıklı Han has been undertaken by award-winning architect Sinan Kafadar – METEKS Group which used to be a hospital in 19th century.

References

External links 
 

Hotel chains in the United States
Companies based in New York City
Hospitality companies of the United States
2016 mergers and acquisitions